Fasano is an Italian surname. Notable people with the surname include:

 Alessio Fasano, Italian pediatric gastroenterologist
 Anthony Fasano (born 1984), American football tight-end
 Clara Fasano (1900–1990), Italian-born American sculptor
 Joseph Fasano (born 1982), poet
 Len Fasano, American politician
 Mike Fasano (born 1958), state politician in Florida
 Renato Fasano (1902-1979), Italian conductor and musicologist, Founder of I Virtuosi di Roma. 
 Sal Fasano (born 1971), American baseball catcher

See also 

 Fasana (surname)

Italian-language surnames